The 2019 Just World Indoor Bowls Championship was held at Potters Leisure Resort, Hopton-on-Sea, Great Yarmouth, England, from 10–27 January 2019. The event is organised by the World Bowls Tour.

Stewart Anderson won his second open singles title after defeating surprise qualifier Simon Skelton in the final. Julie Forrest of Scotland defeated Alison Merrien of Guernsey to win the women's singles.

Alex Marshall and Paul Foster won the open pairs title for the fourth time as a pair and the sixth and fifth time respectively. Robert Paxton and Ellen Falkner won the mixed pairs event.

Winners

Draw and results

Open singles

Women's singles

Open pairs

Mixed pairs

Open Under 25 Singles

References

World Indoor Bowls Championship
2019 in bowls
World Indoor Bowls Championship
International sports competitions hosted by England
World Indoor Bowls Championship
Sport in Great Yarmouth
World Indoor Bowls